Alcidodes richteri is a species of the true weevil family.

References

 Zipcodezoo Species Identifier
 Catalogue of life
  Encyclopedia of Life

Alcidinae
Beetles described in 1892